Jeleni Róg  (formerly , or Düpe) is a settlement in the administrative district of Gmina Człopa, within Wałcz County, West Pomeranian Voivodeship, in north-western Poland.

For the history of the region, see History of Pomerania.

The settlement has a population of 6.

References

Villages in Wałcz County